Glory Times is a 1995 compilation album by English band Portishead which contains mixes of songs from Dummy as well as the theme from their short film To Kill a Dead Man. The two discs are the same as the respective singles for "Sour Times" and "Glory Box".

Track listing
Disc one
"Sour Sour Times" – 4:07
"Lot More" – 4:21
"Sheared Times" – 4:17
"Airbus Reconstruction" – 5:08
"Theme from To Kill a Dead Man" – 4:25

Disc two
"Glory Box" (edit) – 3:35
"Glory Box" (Mudflap Mix) – 5:28
"Scorn" – 6:04
"Sheared Box" – 3:30
"Toy Box" – 5:43

References

1995 compilation albums
Portishead (band) compilation albums
1995 remix albums
Portishead (band) remix albums
Go! Discs compilation albums
Go! Discs Records remix albums
London Records compilation albums
London Records remix albums